The list of Alpha Delta Pi chapters includes undergraduate chapters of the Alpha Delta Pi sorority.

Chapters

Canada

United States

Notes and references

Lists of chapters of United States student societies by society
chapters